The Church of Saint Gemma Galgani is a Roman Catholic parish church in the neighbourhood of Flor de Maroñas, Montevideo, Uruguay.

The parish was established on 15 May 1965. Held by the Passionists, the temple is dedicated to saint Gemma Galgani, a former lay member of the Order.

The temple also hosts concerts by the Montevideo Symphony Orchestra.

References

External links
 Portal of the Parish Church of St. Gemma Galgani

1965 establishments in Uruguay 
 
Roman Catholic church buildings in Montevideo
Passionist Order
20th-century Roman Catholic church buildings in Uruguay